The 2017 season was the Harrisburg City Islanders's 14th season of competitive soccer - its first in the second division of American soccer, and its seventh season in United Soccer League.

This was the club's final season under its original name, with the club renamed Penn FC (in full, Penn Football Club) shortly after the end of the season.

Review 
For the 2017 season, the City Islanders played all their home matches at FNB Field rather than splitting time between Harrisburg and Clipper Magazine Stadium in Lancaster. This decision was made to focus on marketing the team more intently in Harrisburg area.

The 2017 season marked the first time the City Islanders competed in the second division of American soccer after USL was granted provisional Division II status.

The season would also kick off under new majority ownership joined by George Altirs of Capelli Sports. The new ownership has intended to invest in the club to keep up with the growing league and keep the team in Harrisburg. Despite additional investment and club connections to Ghanaian club, International Allies F.C., the City Islanders failed to make the playoffs for the third consecutive season.

At the conclusion of the season, it was announced that the Harrisburg City Islanders would be re-branded as Penn FC for the 2018 season marking the end of the "City Islanders" name after 14 seasons.

Roster 

Updated as of July 21, 2017.

Transfers

In

Out

Loan in

Competitions

Preseason

USL

Standings (Eastern Conference)

Results 
All times in Eastern Time.

2017 Harrisburg City Islanders Regular Season Schedule

Results summary

U.S. Open Cup 

The City Islanders competed in the 2017 edition of the U.S. Open Cup, entering the competition in the second round. They were eliminated in the fourth round to the Philadelphia Union for the second consecutive year.

All times in Eastern Time.

Statistics 
As of December 3, 2017.

Players with names struck through and marked  left the club during the playing season.
Players with names in italics were loaned players.
Players with names marked * were on loan from another club for the whole of their season with Harrisburg.
League denotes USL regular season
Playoffs denotes USL playoffs

Goalkeepers

League Stats 
As of December 3, 2017.

Record: W-L-D

U.S. Open Cup Stats 
As of June 24, 2017.

Record: W-L-D

Honors 

 Week 9 Team of the Week: Honorable Mention M Rasheed Olabiyi
 Week 14 Team of the Week: Honorable Mention F Pedro Ribeiro
 Week 15 Player of the Week: F Pedro Ribeiro
 Week 17 Team of the Week: G Brandon Miller and M Mouhamed Dabo Honorable Mention M Ropapa Mensah
 Week 17 Goal of the Week: M Ropapa Mensah
 Week 18 Team of the Week: Honorable Mention G Brandon Miller

References 

Harrisburg City Islanders
Harrisburg City Islanders
Penn FC seasons
Harrisburg City Islanders